CIEU-FM is a french language community radio station that operates at 94.9 FM in Carleton-sur-Mer, Quebec, Canada and is also heard at 106.1 FM in Paspébiac.

The station is currently owned by Diffusion communautaire Baie-des-Chaleurs.

The station is a member of the Association des radiodiffuseurs communautaires du Québec.

References

External links
www.cieufm.com
 
 

Carleton-sur-Mer
Ieu
Ieu
Ieu
Year of establishment missing